Blepharis maderaspatensis is a species of suffrutescent herb in the family Acanthaceae found in seasonally dry to arid habitats from Africa over Arabia to Southeast Asia.

Distribution
The species is native to continental Africa, Arabia and tropical parts of Asia: the Indian subcontinent, Southeast Asia and Hainan in China.

Description
Maderaspatensis is described as being a  scrambling, suffrutescent perennial herb which can stem up to 2.5 m in height with whorled four hairy leaves that are elliptic of size  2–9(–12.5) × 0.8–3.5(–5) cm, at each node, with axillary spike inflorescence. and white flowers 1/2 inches long found in the clustered form .

References

maderaspatensis